The Women's discus throw F13 event for visually impaired athletes was held at the 2004 Summer Paralympics in the Athens Olympic Stadium on 23 September. It was won by Xu Hong Yan, representing .

Result

23 Sept. 2004, 17:00

References

W
2004 in women's athletics